Mount Richardson is located in unorganized territory of Mont-Albert,  in La Haute-Gaspésie Regional County Municipality, in Gaspésie National Park, in administrative region of Gaspésie–Îles-de-la-Madeleine, in Quebec, Canada and its altitude is .

Toponymy 
The mount's name commemorates the geologist James Richardson (1810-1883), who explored the Gaspé Peninsula in 1858 on behalf of the Geological Survey of Canada. He enriched the collection of mineral specimens and introduced photography in the service of geological exploration. The name appeared on a geological map in 1925.

Geography 
It is part of the McGerrigle chain with Xalibu and Jacques-Cartier.

The alpine tundra dominates its cone-shaped summit offering a 360-degree point of view.

Notes and references

External links 
 Official site of the Gaspésie National Park
 Official Statistics Canada site

Appalachian summits
Geography of Gaspésie–Îles-de-la-Madeleine
Notre Dame Mountains
La Haute-Gaspésie Regional County Municipality
One-thousanders of Quebec